Shah Hussain Hotak,, son of Mirwais Hotak, was the fifth and last ruler of the Hotak dynasty. An ethnic Pashtun (Afghan) from the Ghilji tribe, he succeeded to the throne after the death of his brother Mahmud Hotak in 1725. He was also a Pashto language poet. While his cousin Ashraf ruled most of Persia from Isfahan, Hussain ruled Kandahar, but was defeated.

Ashraf Khan's death in 1729 marked the end of the very short lived Hotak rule in Persia (Iran), but Kandahar was still under Hussain's control until 1738 when Nader Shah conquered it. It was only a short pause before the establishment of the last Afghan Empire in 1747.

See also
Hotak dynasty
History of Afghanistan
Siege of Kandahar

References

External links

An Outline Of The History Of Persia During The Last Two Centuries (A.D. 1722–1922)
Hotak Rule

1738 deaths
18th-century Afghan monarchs
18th-century poets
Pashtun people
People from Kandahar
Year of birth unknown
Hotak dynasty
18th-century Afghan poets